Taygete barydelta is a moth in the family Autostichidae. It was described by Edward Meyrick in 1923. It is found in Pará, Brazil.

The wingspan is about 7 mm. The forewings are yellow whitish, scattered with black scales and with large blackish flattened-triangular spots on the costa near the base and at one-third and three-fifths, smaller blackish spots on the dorsum opposite the two posterior. There is also a triangular blackish apical spot. The hindwings are grey.

References

Moths described in 1923
Taygete (moth)